Andrew Lapthorne defeated the defending champion Dylan Alcott in the final, 6–1, 6–0 to win the quad singles wheelchair tennis title at the 2019 US Open. Alcott was attempting to complete the Grand Slam.

Seeds

Draw

Final

Round robin
Standings are determined by: 1. number of wins; 2. number of matches; 3. in two-players-ties, head-to-head records; 4. in three-players-ties, percentage of sets won, or of games won; 5. steering-committee decision.

External links
 Draw

Wheelchair Quad Singles
U.S. Open, 2019 Quad Singles